George Fullerton may refer to:

George Fullerton (cricketer) (1922–2002), South African cricketer
George Fullerton (politician) (1802–1883), member of the Queensland Legislative Council
George Stuart Fullerton (1859–1925), American philosopher and psychologist
George William Fullerton (1923–2009), electric guitar innovator